Moundville Airport  is a privately owned, public-use airport in Hale County, Alabama, United States. It is located two nautical miles (2.3 mi, 3.7 km) south of the central business district of Moundville, Alabama.

Facilities and aircraft 
It has two runways with turf surfaces: 9/27 is 2,053 by 100 feet (626 x 30 m) and 18/36 is 2,400 by 80 feet (732 x 24 m).

References

External links 
 Aerial photo as of 25 January 1992 from USGS The National Map

Privately owned airports
Airports in Alabama
Transportation buildings and structures in Hale County, Alabama